Lady Daeryangwon of the Yi clan was the daughter of Yi Jeong-eon from the Kingdom of Unified Silla. who became the 13rd wife of Taejo of Goryeo. Meanwhile, there is a theory that she was the birth mother of Anjong Wang Uk, but later her son was formally adopted by Queen Sinseong.

References

Year of birth unknown
Year of death unknown
Consorts of Taejo of Goryeo
People from South Gyeongsang Province